The following list summarizes notable first ascents of mountains and peaks in the Cordillera Blanca in the Andes of Ancash, Peru, in chronological order.

See also

List of highest mountains

Notes 
 Juanjo Tomé, Escaladas en los Andes - Guía de la Cordillera Blanca, Madrid: Desnivel Ediciones, 1999, 
 Lefebvre, Thierry, L’invention occidentale de la haute montagne andine, M@ppemonde Vol. 19 (2005).
 Frederick L. Wolfe, High Summits: 370 Famous Peak First Ascents and Other Significant Events in Mountaineering History, Hugo House Publishers, 2013,  (for a guideline; the book contains many major errors)

References 

Lists of mountains
Climbing and mountaineering-related lists
Peru-related lists of superlatives
Mountaineering in Peru
first ascents